Florin Berenguer-Bohrer (born 1 April 1989) is a French professional footballer who plays as an attacking midfielder for Australian club Melbourne City FC.

Club career
Berenguer trained at the youth academy of Sochaux. He began his senior career in 2009 for Dijon FCO, playing in both Ligue 1 and Ligue 2. In mid-2014, he transferred to his former club Sochaux-Montbéliard, also of Ligue 2, where he stayed for close to four years.

In September 2018, Berenguer was picked up by Australian A-League club Melbourne City ahead of the 2018–19 season.

Honours
Melbourne City
 A-League Premiership: 2020–21, 2021–22
 A-League Championship: 2021

Individual
 PFA A-League Team of the Season: 2021–22

References

External links
 
 
 

Living people
1989 births
Sportspeople from Montbéliard
French footballers
Association football midfielders
Ligue 1 players
Ligue 2 players
A-League Men players
Dijon FCO players
FC Sochaux-Montbéliard players
Melbourne City FC players
French expatriate footballers
French expatriate sportspeople in Australia
Expatriate soccer players in Australia
Footballers from Bourgogne-Franche-Comté